Mammillaria dioica, also called the strawberry cactus, California fishhook cactus, strawberry pincushion or fishhook cactus, is a cactus species of the genus Mammillaria. Its common name in Spanish is biznaga llavina.

Distribution
The cactus is found in the western Colorado Desert scrub including in Anza-Borrego Desert State Park, and in Coastal sage scrub habitats of Southern California; and in coastal chaparral and Sonoran Desert habitats of Baja California and Baja California Sur states on the Baja California Peninsula of México.

Polyploid wild plants of this species have been found in Mexico.  Both tetraploid and hexaploid varieties have been recorded.

Description
Mammillaria dioica possesses short, firm tubercles ending in the spines.  Most of these spines are whitish and straight, but each tubercle has a longer central spine which is slightly curved and dark.

A single plant can bear both male and female flowers, from mid-spring to mid-summer.  Some plants may produce bisexual flowers as well, thus totaling three types of flower on a single plant.  The flowers are white to cream in color and range from 10 millimeters (0.4 inch) to 30 millimeters (1.2 inches) in length.

The fruits produced are bright red and ovoid, often with one end thicker than the other and are edible and tastes like a cross between a strawberry and a kiwi. The seeds are small (0.6 to 0.8 millimeters), black, and pitted.

Subspecies
Recognized subspecies include:
 Mammillaria dioica subsp dioica
 Mammillaria dioica subsp angelensis 
 Mammillaria dioica subsp estebanensis

Uses
The Kumeyaay people (Diegueño), of Baja California and Southern California, eat the raw fruits as a food source.

Cultivation
Mammillaria dioica is cultivated by specialty cactus plant nurseries and by botanical gardens for plant sales. It requires very well-drained soil, and so is often grown in pots and in raised beds in drought tolerant gardens.

References

 U.S. Army Field Manuals: Survival IQ Handbook

External links

CalFlora Database: Mammillaria dioica (fish hook cactus, strawberry cactus)
USDA Plants Profile for Mammillaria dioica (strawberry cactus)
Jepson Manual Treatment of Mammillaria dioica
efloras.org: Flora of North America: Mammillaria dioica
Mammillarias.net: Mammillaria dioica
Mammillaria dioica — CalPhoto gallery

dioica
Cacti of Mexico
Cacti of the United States
Desert fruits
Flora of Baja California
Flora of Baja California Sur
Flora of California
Flora of the California desert regions
Flora of the Sonoran Deserts
Natural history of the Colorado Desert
Plants used in Native American cuisine
Garden plants of North America
Flora without expected TNC conservation status